Judyann Elder (born Judith Ann Johnson) is an American actress, director, and writer. Elder played Nadine Waters on the FOX sitcom Martin. She also played Harriette Winslow on CBS Family Matters for the remaining eight episodes of its ninth and final season after the departure of Jo Marie Payton. Elder is also a veteran of the stage who has appeared in scores of theatrical productions throughout the United States and Europe.

Early life and career 
Born in Cleveland, Elder is the daughter of Edward T. Johnson, PhD. and Camille Johnson (née Russell). Elder attended Shaker Heights High School and graduated from Emerson College in Boston as the first recipient of the Carol Burnett Award in the Performing Arts. Elder began her professional career in off-Broadway in New York as "Judyann Jonsson". A founding member and resident actor with the Tony Award-winning Negro Ensemble Company, she originated roles in the premier productions of The Song of the Lusitanian Bogey, Daddy Goodness, Kongi's Harvest, and God is a (Guess What?).

In 1969, she played the role of Russell B. Parker's young love interest in Lonne Elder III's Ceremonies in Dark Old Men and toured with the company to London and Rome. She married the play's Pulitzer Prize nominated author early that same year, thus changing her name to Judyann Elder. Elder and her husband moved to Los Angeles soon after, where she broadened her career to include roles on screen. She made guest star roles in series such as The Streets of San Francisco, Sanford and Son, Wonder Woman, and The White Shadow. In 1976, Elder made her Broadway debut at the Ambassador Theatre as Coretta King opposite Billy Dee Williams in I Have a Dream directed by Robert Greenwald. She subsequently portrayed the role of Bernette Wilson in the television mini-series A Woman Called Moses starring Cicely Tyson.  Several roles on screen followed including Forget Paris with Billy Crystal, The Players Club directed by Ice Cube, and Seven Pounds with Will Smith.

In the 1991–92 season of TV's Murphy Brown starring Candice Bergen, Elder portrayed Murphy Brown's obstetrician, Dr. Barton. Her recurring role culminated with the historic season finale where Dr. Barton delivered Murphy Brown's baby. She played Gina's mother, Nadine Waters, on Martin (1992—97), starring Martin Lawrence; Gina was played by Tisha Campbell. In 1998, she replaced Jo Marie Payton as Harriette Winslow in the last episodes of the popular show Family Matters.

Elder has frequently returned to the stage and last appeared at Arkansas Rep as Rose in August Wilson's Fences. She also has many theatre directorial credits including: The Book of the Crazy African (Skylight Theatre), The Meeting (Inner City Cultural Center, LA and New Federal Theatre, NY), Ceremonies in Dark Old Men (Beverly Canon Theatre), and A Private Act (Robey Theatre Company). Her direction of Matthew Lopez' The Whipping Man starring Charlie Robinson at the Skirball Cultural Center for LA Theatre Works radio series was broadcast nationally in 2016. Elder is an alumna of the American Film Institute's Directing Workshop for Women where she produced and directed the short film, Behind God's Back, based on an Alice Walker short story and starring Beau Bridges. She is also the recipient of a Screenwriting Fellowship with Walt Disney Studios. In 2005, Elder was honored with an NAACP Trailblazer Award. Elder is also a 2010 recipient of a Distinguished Alumni Award from Emerson College.

Personal life 
Elder has been married twice. Her first marriage to actor and playwright Lonne Elder III, with whom she had two children, including actor Christian E. Elder, was from 1969 to 1994. Elder has been married to her second husband, actor John Cothran Jr. since 1997. She is a breast cancer survivor and former legislative ambassador for the American Cancer Society. Elder resides in Los Angeles, California.

Filmography

Film

As director
 1989: Behind God's Back – Short film (also narrator)
 2013: A Private Act – Short film (also screenplay)

Television

References

External links 
Judyann Elder at the Lortel Archives – The Internet Off-Broadway Database

American theatre directors
Women theatre directors
Living people
Actresses from Cleveland
Emerson College alumni
African-American actresses
American television actresses
American film actresses
American stage actresses
21st-century African-American people
21st-century African-American women
20th-century African-American people
20th-century African-American women
Year of birth missing (living people)